TV Channell was an early Australian television that aired live on Sydney station ABN-2 from 15 November 1956 to around 11 April 1957, airing on Thursdays, and starred Douglas Channell. It was replaced on ABN's schedule by The Johnny Gredula Show. Gredula had appeared previously on an episode of TV Channell.

TV Channell was a variety show. An episode broadcast on 7 February 1957 featured regulars pianist Reg Lewis; organist Wilbur Kentwell; singers Margaret Day, Ross Higgins, and Brian Lawrence; fire-eater Ya Yahmen and organist Perc Roberts.

1957-era TV listings suggest that some of the TV Channell episodes were kinescoped for broadcast on Melbourne television station ABV-2, but it is not known if any of these recordings still exist.

References

External links

1956 Australian television series debuts
1957 Australian television series endings
Australian variety television shows
English-language television shows
Black-and-white Australian television shows
Australian live television series
Australian Broadcasting Corporation original programming